Pristidactylus casuhatiensis, the Casuhatien anole, is a species of lizard in the family Leiosauridae. The species is endemic to Argentina.

References

Pristidactylus
Reptiles of Argentina
Reptiles described in 1968
Taxa named by José María Alfonso Félix Gallardo